Mouth to Mouth is the debut album by American disco act Lipps Inc. with Cynthia Johnson on lead vocals.

The album was released in 1979 on Casablanca Records and contains the 1980 double platinum-selling hit "Funkytown", which hit #1 in 28 different countries. The album was arranged, produced and mostly written by Steven Greenberg, who also played multiple instruments on the album.

Track listing
All songs written by Steven Greenberg, except where noted.

Side A
 "Funkytown" - 7:50
 "All Night Dancing" - 8:20

Side B
 "Rock It" - 5:40
 "Power" - 7:59 (Sandy Atlas, Steven Greenberg)

Personnel
Cynthia Johnson - lead vocals, backing vocals, saxophone
Terry Grant - bass
Tom Riopelle, David Rivkin - guitars
Steven Greenberg - keyboards, synthesizers, bass, drums, percussion, additional vocals 
Roger Dumas, Ivan Rafowitz - keyboards, synthesizers
Dana Greenberg - backing vocals
Joyce Lapinsky - backing vocals
Jack Gillespie, Richard Jorgenson, Dale Mendenhal, Bruce Allard - horns
Brian Mintz, Karl Nashan, Herman Straka, Bruce Allard, Bob Zelnick - violins

Production
Arranged & produced by Steven Greenberg
Engineered & mixed by David Rivkin; assisted by Mike Severson
Mastered by Chris Bellman

Charts

Weekly charts

Year-end charts

Sales and certifications

References

External links
Mouth To Mouth at Discogs.com

1979 debut albums
Lipps Inc. albums
Casablanca Records albums